The Philippine crocodile (Crocodylus mindorensis), also known as the Mindoro crocodile, the Philippine freshwater crocodile, the bukarot in Ilocano, and more generally as a buwaya in most Filipino lowland cultures, is one of two species of crocodiles found in the Philippines; the other is the larger saltwater crocodile (Crocodylus porosus).  The Philippine crocodile, the species endemic only to the country, went from data deficient to critically endangered in 2008 from exploitation and unsustainable fishing methods, such as dynamite fishing. Conservation methods are being taken by the Dutch/Filipino Mabuwaya foundation, the Crocodile Conservation Society and the Zoological Institute of HerpaWorld in Mindoro island. It is strictly prohibited to kill a crocodile in the country, and it is punishable by law.

Taxonomy
Until 1989, it was considered a subspecies of the New Guinea crocodile (Crocodylus novaeguineae). They are now recognized as closely related but separate species.

Evolution
The genus Crocodylus likely originated in Africa and radiated outwards towards Southeast Asia and the Americas, although an Australia/Asia origin has also been considered. Phylogenetic evidence supports Crocodylus diverging from its closest recent relative, the extinct Voay of Madagascar, around 25 million years ago, near the Oligocene/Miocene boundary.

Phylogeny
Below is a cladogram based on a 2018 tip dating study by Lee & Yates simultaneously using morphological, molecular (DNA sequencing), and stratigraphic (fossil age) data, as revised by the 2021 Hekkala et al. paleogenomics study using DNA extracted from the extinct Voay.

Characteristics
The Philippine crocodile is a crocodilian endemic to the Philippines. It is a relatively small, freshwater crocodile. It has a relatively broad snout and thick bony plates on its back (heavy dorsal armor). Females are slightly smaller than males. Philippine crocodiles are golden-brown in color, which darkens as they mature.

Distribution and habitat

The Philippine crocodile has been extirpated in Samar, Jolo, Negros, Masbate, and Busuanga. Populations still survive in the Northern Sierra Madre Natural Park within the Luzon rainforest, San Mariano, Isabela, Dalupiri island in the Babuyan Islands, Abra (province) in Luzon and the Ligawasan Marsh, Lake Sebu in South Cotabato, Pulangi River in Bukidnon, Paghungawan Marsh in Siargao Island, and possibly in the Agusan Marsh Wildlife Sanctuary in Mindanao. The Philippine crocodile wildlife populations that reside in these locations live geographically isolated from each other, which ultimately impacts their population level differentiation and decreases genetic diversity. It was historically found in parts of Visayas and until the numbers were drastically cut by, mainly, habitat destruction. These Crocodiles eat ailing fish in a significantly higher proportion than healthy fish, thus improving the common health of the fish stock. By preying on the most common fish, they balance the fish population; any species which suddenly becomes dominant is put back in its proper proportion. Crocodile droppings are nutritious for the fish and contain critically important chemicals.

Conservation status

Crocodylus mindorensis is considered to be the most severely threatened crocodile species in the world, listed as critically endangered by the IUCN. A population estimate of 100 non-hatchling individuals underlines the critical status of the species. Although this species was once found over the whole of the Philippines, it is now critically endangered. In addition, very little is known about the natural history or ecology of the species, or its relationship with Crocodylus porosus, whose range it overlaps. More surveys are required to determine the present range. Initial population reduction was through commercial exploitation, although the current threat is mainly from removal of suitable habitat for agricultural purposes to satisfy a rapidly expanding human population. Governmental support for any conservation measures is limited, and the crocodiles are often killed by the local populace. Long-term captive breeding and release (through PWRCC, Silliman University, and international breeding centres) is judged to be the best course to take at present, although a management program is imperative for the remainder of the wild population (most of which reside in only one protected area). In 1992, fewer than 1000 animals were estimated to remain in the wild. In 1995, that estimate was revised to be no more than 100 nonhatchlings (hatchlings are rarely counted in surveys because their survival rate is so low). One of the threats to the diminishing population of Philippine crocodile is because it is misunderstood. In mainstream Filipino society, crocodiles are considered dangerous man-eaters and compared to corrupt government officials and law enforcers. They are respected by the indigenous community: in research conducted among permanent residents of Lake Panlabuhan, a tributary of the famous Agusan Marsh, the acceptance of the crocodiles among these residents is very high and their risk perception is very low.  However, the crocodile have an image problem with outsiders. To many, they are viewed as man-eaters. In reality, the crocodile is small and will not attack people unless provoked.

Since October 2021, C. mindorensis has been classified as Critically Depleted by the IUCN.

The killing of crocodiles seems to be the major cause of the decreasing number of this species. In northeast Luzon, a community-based conservation approach developed under the Crocodile Rehabilitation Observance and Conservation (CROC) project was adopted with the aim of reaching sustainable co-habitation of crocodiles and local people.

In 2007, a specialist group was founded by several people within the Philippines, involved in crocodilian conservation. The Crocodile Conservation Society Philippines and the Zoological Institute of HerpaWorld are working on conservation breeding and release programs. C. mindorensis was considered locally extinct in part of its former range in northern Luzon until a live specimen was caught in San Mariano, Isabela, in 1999. That individual, nicknamed 'Isabela' by its captors, was given to the care of the Crocodile Rehabilitation Observance and Conservation until it was released in August 2007. The specimen was 1.6 m long at the time of its release.

The Philippine crocodile became nationally protected by law in 2001 with the enactment of Republic Act 9147 known as the Wildlife Act. It is punishable to kill a crocodile, with a maximum penalty of ₱100,000 (equivalent to about $2,500). The Philippine Senate introduced resolution no. 790 on May 31, 2012, to further strengthen and augment existing laws for the protection of the Philippine crocodile and the saltwater crocodile.

Media
This crocodile was featured in National Geographic's Dangerous Encounters hosted by crocodile specialist Dr. Brady Barr. In one of the episodes, Barr sought to be the first person to see all species of crocodiles in the world. Fortunately, he was able to see a Philippine crocodile that was about two weeks old.

The hatching of a Philippine crocodile was recorded in GMA News Born to Be Wild. They also recorded that tropical fire ants, an invasive species, eat unhatched endangered bukarot eggs. The media team saved a nest from a fire ant attack. Also recorded were adult Philippine crocodiles.

Mythology, folklore and cultural significance
The ancient Tagalog people believed that the soul of a deceased person is carried from the middle world into either Maca (place where good spirits go) or Kasanaan (place were evil spirits go) through the aid of a buwaya, a crocodile monster with lethargic skin and a tomb attached to its back, covered with its skin. Although considered sacred, the buwayas are also feared as they may also attack living people, encasing them inside its tomb, and descend to the afterlife to bring the person to either Maca or Kasanaan, effectively bringing only the soul to the lands of the dead as the body has already died. Despite the extremes of the buwaya, it is so sacred to the ancient Tagalogs to the point that killing one (with a tomb or none) is punishable by death.

In Philippine Media, the Philippine Crocodile often associated with corruption in the government, specifically the Senate and the House of Representatives.

References

Further reading 

 Philippine Crocodile: WhoZoo
 Crocodilian Species-Philippine Crocodile (Crocodylus mindorensis)
 "Crocodylus mindorensis - HerpaWorld"

External links
Mabuwaya Foundation 

Crocodylidae
Endemic fauna of the Philippines
Reptiles of the Philippines
Fauna of Mindanao
Critically endangered fauna of Asia
Reptiles described in 1935
Crocodilians of Asia